Ride, Ryder, Ride! is a 1949 American Cinecolor Western film directed by Lewis D. Collins and starring Jim Bannon, Don Reynolds and Emmett Lynn. It is based on the Red Ryder series by Fred Harman, one of four films made by Eagle-Lion Films featuring the character.

Cast
Jim Bannon as Red Ryder 
Don Reynolds as Little Beaver
Emmett Lynn as Buckskin Blodgett
Marin Sais as The Duchess, Red's Aunt
Edwin Max as Frenchy Beaumont
Peggy Stewart as Libby Brooks
Steve Pendleton as Gerry Brooks
Jean Budinger as Marge
Jack O'Shea as henchman Blackjack
Fred Coby as Henry W. Iverson
William Fawcett as judge Prescott
Steve Clark as Tom - printer
Billy Hammond as henchman Pinto

References

External links

American Western (genre) films
American black-and-white films
1949 Western (genre) films
Films directed by Lewis D. Collins
Eagle-Lion Films films
Cinecolor films
1940s American films
Red Ryder films
1940s English-language films